Myennis monticola is a species of ulidiid or picture-winged fly in the genus Myennis of the family Ulidiidae.

Distribution
Tajikistan.

References

Otitinae
Insects described in 1945
Taxa named by Aleksandr Stackelberg
Diptera of Asia
Endemic fauna of Tajikistan